10,000 (ten thousand) is the natural number following 9,999 and preceding 10,001.

Name

In many of these languages, it often denotes a very large but indefinite number.

The classical Greeks used letters of the Greek alphabet to represent Greek numerals: they used a capital letter mu (Μ) to represent ten thousand. This Greek root was used in early versions of the metric system in the form of the decimal prefix myria-.

The number ten thousand can also be written as 10,000 (UK and US), 10.000 (Central America and South America, as well as mainland Europe), 10 000 (transition metric), or 10•000 (with the dot raised to the middle of the zeroes; metric).

In mathematics
In scientific notation it is written as 104 or 1 E+4 (equivalently 1 E4) in E notation.

It is the square of 100 and the square root of 100,000,000. 

The value of a myriad to the power of itself, 1000010000 = 1040000.

It has a total of 25 divisors, whose geometric mean averages a whole number, 100. 

It has a reduced totient of 500, and a totient of 4,000, with a total of 16 integers having a totient value of 10,000.

There are a total of 1,229 prime numbers less than ten thousand, a count that is itself prime. 
 
A myriagon is a polygon with ten thousand edges, and a total of 25 dihedral symmetry groups when including the myriagon itself, alongside  25 cyclic groups as subgroups.

In science
 In astronomy,
 asteroid Number: 10000 Myriostos, Provisional Designation: , Discovery Date: September 30, 1951, by A. G. Wilson:List of asteroids (9001-10000).
 In climate, Summary of 10000 Years is one of several pages of the Climate Timeline Tool: Exploring Weather & Climate Change Through the Powers of 10 sponsored by the National Climatic Data Center of the National Oceanic & Atmospheric Administration.
 In computers, NASA built a 10000-processor Linux computer (it is actually a 10,240-processor) called Columbia.
 In geography,Land of 10000 Lakes is the nickname for the state of Minnesota.
 Land of 10000 Trails or 10000trails.com is an organization created in 1999 by the TN/KY Lakes Area Coalition and based in West Tennessee and West Kentucky to promote tourism by developing trails in the region.
 Ten Thousand Islands National Wildlife Refuge is situated in the lower end of the Fakahatchee and Picayune Strands of Big Cypress Swamp and west of Everglades National Park in Florida.
 Valley of Ten Thousand Smokes in Alaska.
 In physics,
 Myria- (and myrio-) is an obsolete metric prefix that denoted a factor of 10+4, ten thousand, or 10,000.
 10,000 hertz, 10 kilohertz, or 10 kHz of the radio frequency spectrum falls in the very low frequency or VLF band and has a wavelength of 30 kilometres.
 In orders of magnitude (speed), the speed of a fast neutron is 10000 km/s.
 In acoustics, 10,000 hertz, 10 kilohertz, or 10 kHz of a sound signal at sea level has a wavelength of about 34 mm.
 In music, a 10 kilohertz sound is a E♭9 in the A440 pitch standard, a bit more than an octave higher in pitch than the highest note on a standard piano.

In time
 10000 BC, 10000 BCE, or 10th millennium BC. 10000-year clock or the Clock of the Long Now is a mechanical clock designed to keep time for 10000 years.

In Arts
 In films,
 10,000 Black Men Named George (2002, TV).
 The Phantom from 10,000 Leagues (1956).
 Vietnam: The Ten Thousand Day War (1980, mini).
 In music,
 10,000 Days is the title of the fourth studio album by Tool.
 Ten Thousand Fists is an album by Disturbed.
 10,000 Hz Legend album by Air 2001.
 10,000 Maniacs is a US rock band.
 Ten Thousand Men of Harvard is a fight song of Harvard University.
 10,000 Reasons (album) is a 2013 Christian album by Matt Redman.
 "10,000 Reasons (Bless the Lord)" is a 2013 single by Matt Redman.
 10,000 Promises. is a Japanese pop group.
 "Ten Thousand Strong" is a song by American power metal band Iced Earth.

In other fields
 In currency,
 Two versions of Iraq's 10,000 dinar banknote has Abu Ali Hasan Ibn al-Haitham (also known as Alhazen) on the front and the current issue has sculptor Jawad Saleem's Freedom Monument in Baghdad on the front. Both notes have an image of Mosul's al-Hadba' Minaret on the back. The first issue had an image of former Iraqi president Saddam Hussein and the Spiral Minaret - Al-Minārat Al-Malwiyyah in Samarra.
 the Japanese ¥10,000 banknote depicts Fukuzawa Yukichi.
 Kazakhstan's 10,000₸ banknote.
 the Lebanese £L10,000 banknote depicts Beirut's Martyrs' Square.
 Myanmar's (Burma's) Ks.10,000/- banknote.
 the U.S. $10,000 note depicts a picture of Salmon P. Chase.
 In distances,
 10 km, 10,000 m, or 1 E+4 m is equal to:
 1 Scandinavian mil.
 about 6.2137 English miles.
 side of square with area 100 km2.
 radius of a circle with area 100  km2 ≈ 314.159 km2.
 In finance, on March 29, 1999, the Dow Jones Industrial Average closed at 10006.78 which was the first time the index closed above the 10,000 mark.
 In futurology, Stewart Brand in Visions of the Future: The 10,000-Year Library proposes a museum built around a 10,000 year clock as an idea for assuring that vital information survives future crashes of civilizations.
 In games,
 Ten Thousand is one name of a dice game that is also called farkle.
 In game shows, The $10,000 Pyramid ran on television from 1973 to 1974.
 In history,
Army of 10,000 Sixty Day Troops, 1862–1863. American Civil War.
 The Army of the Ten Thousand were a group of Ancient Greek mercenaries who marched against Artaxerxes II of Persia.
 the Persian Immortals were also called the Ten Thousand or 10,000 Immortals, so named because their number of 10,000 was immediately re-established after every loss.
 The 10,000 Day War: Vietnam by Michael Maclear   also alternate titles The ten thousand day war: Vietnam, 1945–1975 (10,000 days is 27.4 years).
 Tomb of Ten Thousand Soldiers – defeat of the Tang dynasty army of China in the Nanzhao kingdom in 751.
 In Islamic history, 10,000 is the number of besieging forces led by Muhammad's adversary, Abu Sufyan, during the Battle of the Trench.
 10,000 is the number of Muhammad's soldiers during the conquest of Mecca.
 In language,
 the Chinese, Japanese, Korean, and Vietnamese phrase live for ten thousand years was used to bless emperors in East Asia.
 the words in the Interlingua–English Dictionary are all drawn from 10,000 roots.
 Μύριοι is an Ancient Greek name for 10.000 taken into the modern European languages as 'myriad' (see above). Hebrew, Chinese, Japanese and Korean have words with the same meaning.
 In literature,
 Man'yōshū ( Man'yōshū, Collection of Ten Thousand Leaves) is the oldest existing, and most highly revered, collection of Japanese poetry.
 Ten Thousand a Year 1839 by Samuel Warren.
 Ten Thousand a Year 1883?. A drama, in three acts. Adapted from the celebrated novel of the same name, by the author of the Diary of a Physician, and arranged for the stage by Richard Brinsley Peake.
 Anabasis, by the Greek writer Xenophon (431–360 B.C.), about the Army of the Ten Thousand – Greek mercenaries taking part in the expedition of Cyrus the Younger, a Persian prince, against his brother, King Artaxerxes II.
 The Ten Thousand: A Novel of Ancient Greece by Michael Curtis Ford. 2001.   Historic fiction about the Army of the Ten Thousand.
 The World of the Ten Thousand Things: Poems 1980–1990 by Charles Wright    .
 Ten Thousand Lovers by Edeet Ravel .
 In philosophy, Lao Zi writes about ten thousand things in the Tao Te Ching In Taoism, the "10,000 Things" is a term meaning all of phenomenal reality.
 In piphilology, ten thousand is the current world record for the number of digits of pi memorized by a human being.
 In psychology, Ten Thousand Dreams Interpreted, or what's in a dream: a scientific and practical, by Miller, Gustavus Hindman (1857–1929). Project Gutenberg.
 In religion,
 the Bible,
 has 52 references to ten thousand in the King James Version.
 Revelation 5:11 And I beheld, and I heard the voice of many angels round about the throne and the beasts and the elders: and the number of them was ten thousand times ten thousand, and thousands of thousands.
 hymn, Ten thousand times ten thousand.
 The Ten thousand martyrs.
 In software,
 the Year 10,000 problem is the collective name for all potential software bugs that will emerge as the need to express years with five digits arises.
 In sports,
 In athletics, 10,000 metres, 10 kilometres, 10 km, or 10K (6.2 miles) is the final standard track event in a long-distance track event and a distance in other racing events such as running, cycling, and skiing.
 In bicycle racing, annual Tour of 10,000 Lakes Stage Race in Minneapolis.
 In baseball, on July 15, 2007, the Philadelphia Phillies became the first team in professional sports history to lose 10,000 games.

 Selected numbers in the range 10001-19999 
10001 to 10999
 10007 = smallest five-digit prime number, twin prime with 10009.
 10008 = palindromic in bases 5 (3100135), 22 (KEK22), 28 (CLC28) and 33 (96933) and a Harshad number in bases 2, 3, 4, 5, 6, 7, 8, 10, 13, 14 and 16.
 10009 = twin prime with 10007.
 10080 = highly composite number; number of minutes in a week.
 10111 = palindromic prime in bases 3 (1112121113) and 27 (DND27).
 10176 = smallest (provable) generalized Riesel number in base 10:  is always divisible by one of the prime numbers }.
 10201 = 1012, palindromic square (in the decimal system)
 10206 = pentagonal pyramidal number.
 10223 = sixth last number to be eliminated (in 2016) by Seventeen or Bust (now a sub-project of PrimeGrid) in the Sierpiński problem.
 10239 = Woodall number.
 10252 = Padovan number.
 10267 = cuban prime.
 10301 = palindromic prime in bases 10 (1030110), 27 (E3E27), 30 (BDB30) and 44 (5E544).
 10333 = star prime, palindromic in bases 9 (151519), 31 (ANA31) and 35 (8F835).
 10416 = square pyramidal number.
 10425 = octahedral number.
 10430 = weird number.
 10433 = palindromic prime in base 44 (5H544).
 10440 = 144th triangular number.
 10499 = twin prime with 10501.
 10500 = Harshad number in bases 2, 3, 4, 6, 7, 8, 9, 10, 11, 15 and 16.
 10501 = palindromic prime in bases 10 (1050110) and 58 (37358).
 10512 = Harshad number in bases 2, 3, 4, 5, 7, 8, 9, 10, 13 and 16.
 10538 = 10538 Overture is a hit single by Electric Light Orchestra.
 10560 = Harshad number in bases 2, 3, 4, 5, 6, 8, 9, 10, 11, 12, 13, 14 and 16.
 10570 = weird number.
 10585 = Carmichael number.
 10601 = palindromic prime in bases 10 (1060110) and 30 (BNB30).
 10609 = 1032, tribonacci number.
 10631 =  palindromic prime in base 30 (BOB30).
 10646 = ISO 10646 is the standard for Unicode.
 10648 = 223, the smallest 5-digit cube.
 10660 = tetrahedral number.
 10671 = tetranacci number.
 10700 = 10700 kHz or 10.7 MHz is a standard intermediate frequency for analog superheterodyne FM broadcast band receivers.
 10744 = amicable number with 10856.
 10752 = the second 16-bit word of a TIFF file if the byte order marker is misunderstood.
 10792 = weird number.
 10800 = number of bricks used for the uttaravedi in the Agnicayana ritual.
 10837 = star prime.
 10856 = amicable number with 10744.
 10905 = Wedderburn–Etherington number
 10922 = repdigit in base 4 (22222224), and palindromic in base 8 (252528).
 10946 = Fibonacci number, Markov number.
 10958 = the smallest positive integer that cannot be represented by an equation using increasing order of integers from 1 to 9 and basic arithmetic operations.
 10989 = reverses when multiplied by 9.
 10990 = weird number.

11000 to 11999
 11025 = 1052, sum of the cubes of the first 14 positive integers.
 11083 = palindromic prime in 2 consecutive bases: 23 (KLK23) and 24 (J5J24).
 11111 = repdigit.
 11297 = number of planar partitions of 16
 11298 = Riordan number
 11311 = palindromic prime.
 11340 = Harshad number in bases 2, 3, 4, 5, 6, 7, 8, 9, 10, 11, 12, 13, 15 and 16.
 11353 = star prime.
 11368 = pentagonal pyramidal number
 11410 = weird number.
 11411 = palindromic prime in base 10.
 11424 = Harshad number in bases 3, 5, 6, 7, 8, 9, 10, 11, 12, 13, 15 and 16.
 11440 = square pyramidal number.
 11480 = tetrahedral number.
 11605 = smallest integer to start a run of five consecutive integers with the same number of divisors.
 11690 = weird number.
 11717 = twin prime with 11719.
 11719 = cuban prime, twin prime with 11717.
 11726 = octahedral number.
 11826 = smallest number whose square (algebra) is pandigital without zeros.
 11953 = palindromic prime in bases 7 (465647) and 30 (D8D30).

12000 to 12999
 12000 = 12,000 of each of the twelve tribes of Israel made up the 144,000 servants of God who were 'sealed' according to the Book of Revelation in the New Testament.
 12048 = number of non-isomorphic set-systems of weight 12.
 12097 = cuban prime.
 12101 = Friedman prime.
 12107 = Friedman prime.
 12109 = Friedman prime.
 12110 = weird number.
 12167 = 233
 12172 = number of triangle-free graphs on 10 vertices
 12198 = semi-meandric number
 12251 = number of primes .
 12285 = amicable number with 14595.
 12287 = Thabit number.
 12289 = Proth prime, Pierpont prime.
 12321 = 1112, Demlo number, palindromic square.
 12341 = tetrahedral number.
 12345 = smallest whole number containing all numbers from 1 to 5
 12407 = cited on QI as the smallest uninteresting positive integer in terms of arithmetical mathematics.
 12421 = palindromic prime.
 12496 = smallest sociable number.
 12529 = square pyramidal number.
 12530 = weird number.
 12670 = weird number.
 12721 = palindromic prime.
 12726 = Ruth–Aaron pair.
 12758 = largest number that cannot be expressed as the sum of distinct cubes.
 12765 = Finnish internet meme; the code accompanying no-prize caps in a Coca-Cola bottle top prize contest. Often spelled out yksi – kaksi – seitsemän – kuusi – viisi, ei voittoa, "one – two – seven – six – five, no prize".
 12769 = 1132, palindromic in base 3.
 12821 = palindromic prime.

13000 to 13999
 13131 = octahedral number.
 13244 = tetrahedral number.
 13267 = cuban prime.
 13331 = palindromic prime.
 13370 = weird number.
 13510 = weird number.
 13581 = Padovan number.
 13669 = cuban prime.
 13685 = square pyramidal number.
 13790 = weird number.
 13792 = largest number that is not a sum of 16 fourth powers.
 13820 = meandric number, open meandric number.
 13824 = 243
 13831 = palindromic prime.
 13860 = Pell number.
 13930 = weird number.
 13931 = palindromic prime.
 13950 = pentagonal pyramidal number.

14000 to 14999
 14190 = tetrahedral number.
 14200 = number of n-Queens Problem solutions for n – 12.
 14341 = palindromic prime.
 14400 = 1202, sum of the cubes of the first 15 positive integers.
 14595 = amicable number with 12285.
 14641 = 1212 = 114, palindromic square (base 10).
 14644 = octahedral number.
 14701 = Markov number.
 14741 = palindromic prime.
 14770 = weird number.
 14884 = 1222, palindromic square in base 11.
 14910 = square pyramidal number.

15000 to 15999
 15015 = smallest odd and square-free abundant number.
 15120 = highly composite number.
 15180 = tetrahedral number.
 15376 = 1242, pentagonal pyramidal number.
 15387 = Zeisel number.
 15451 = palindromic prime.
 15511 = Motzkin prime.
 15551 = palindromic prime
 15610 = weird number.
 15625 = 1252 = 253 = 56
 15629 = Friedman prime.
 15640 = initial number of only four-, five-, or six-digit century to contain two prime quadruples (in between which lies a record prime gap of 43).
 15661 = Friedman prime.
 15667 = second nice Friedman prime.
 15679 = Friedman prime.
 15793 – number of parallelogram polyominoes with 13 cells.
 15841 = Carmichael number.
 15876 = 1262, palindromic square in base 5.
 15890 = weird number.

16000 to 16999
 16030 = weird number.
 16061 = palindromic prime.
 16072 = logarithmic number.
 16091 = strobogrammatic prime.
 16206 = square pyramidal number.
 16269 = octahedral number.
 16310 = weird number.
 16361 = palindromic prime.
 16381 = Friedman prime.
 16384 = 1282 = 214, palindromic in base 15.
 16447 = third nice Friedman prime.
 16561 = palindromic prime.
 16580 = Leyland number.
 16651 = cuban prime.
 16661 = palindromic prime.
 16730 = weird number.
 16759 = Friedman prime.
 16796 = Catalan number.
 16807 = 75
 16843 = smallest Wolstenholme prime.
 16870 = weird number.
 16879 = Friedman prime.
 16896 = pentagonal pyramidal number.
 16999 = number of partially ordered set with 8 unlabeled elements.

17000 to 17999
 17073 = number of free 11-ominoes.
 17163 = the largest number that is not the sum of the squares of distinct primes.
 17272 = weird number.
 17296 = amicable number with 18416.
 17344 = Kaprekar number.
 17389 = 2000th prime number.
 17471 = palindromic prime.
 17570 = weird number.
 17575 = square pyramidal number.
 17576 = 263, palindromic in base 5.
 17689 = 1332, palindromic in base 11.
 17711 = Fibonacci number.
 17971 = palindromic prime.
 17990 = weird number.
 17991 = Padovan number.

18000 to 18999
 18010 = octahedral number.
 18181 = palindromic prime, strobogrammatic prime.
 18334 = number of planar partitions of 17
 18410 = weird number.
 18416 = amicable number with 17296.
 18481 = palindromic prime.
 18496 = 1362, sum of the cubes of the first 16 positive integers.
 18600 = harmonic divisor number.
 18620 = harmonic divisor number.
 18785 = Leyland number.
 18830 = weird number.
 18970 = weird number.

19000 to 19999
 19019 = square pyramidal number.
 19141 = unique prime in base 12.
 19302 = number of ways to partition {1,2,3,4,5,6,7} and then partition each cell (block) into subcells.
 19390 = weird number.
 19391 = palindromic prime.
 19441 = cuban prime.
 19455 = smallest integer that cannot be expressed as a sum of fewer than 548 ninth powers.
 19513 = tribonacci number.
 19531 = repunit prime in base 5.
 19600 = 1402, tetrahedral number.
 19601/13860 ≈ √2
 19609 = first prime followed by a prime gap of over fifty.
 19670 = weird number.
 19683 = 273, 39
 19739 = fourth nice Friedman prime.
 19871 = octahedral number.
 19891 = palindromic prime.
 19927 = cuban prime.
 19991''' = palindromic prime.

Primes
There are 1033 prime numbers between 10000 and 20000, a count that is itself prime. It is 196 prime numbers less than the number of primes between 0 and 10000 (1229, also prime).

See also
 
 10,000 (disambiguation)

Notes

References

External links

10000 (number)
10000